Cadet college is a special military school system of British India and later, Pakistan and Bangladesh.

History

British India 

This system was first established in the pre-Partition, pre-Independence era in order to support the push to indigenise the officer corps of the British Indian Army, a reward to the social classes that had provided loyal support for the British Empire's war efforts in the 1914-1918 First World War and which in return expected greater opportunities for participation at higher levels.

The first to be established was the Prince of Wales Royal Indian Military College (RIMC) in March 1922 at Doon Valley which was then in Punjab Province (now the Indian state of Uttarakhand) following the severe difficulties in acceptance and adjustment faced by the first batch of South Asian cadets sent directly to Royal Military Academy Sandhurst in England.

RIMC was lost with the partition of the country and the army in August 1947 and became the Indian Republic's Rashtriya Indian Military College. The first cadet college to be built by the newly established Pakistan Army was the Punjab Cadet College Hasanabdal, Attock District in Punjab in 1954. Faujdarhat Cadet College was built in Chittagong, then East Pakistan in 1958.

In 1922 the British Indian Army established the King George Royal Indian Military Schools (KGRIMS) in Punjab Province at Jalandhar Cantonment with extension campus at Jhelum for the purpose of providing education to the sons of the enlisted men and Other Ranks of the Army. KGRIMS opened between 1925-1930 at Jullundhar, Jhelum and Ajmer. Later two more KGRIMS were started at Belgaum and Bangalore.

Pakistan after partition of India 

After independence and partition the Jhelum campus was upgraded to the status of a military college and is known as Military College Jhelum.

The expansion of the Pakistan armed forces, and the broadening of the social base of its officers corps from the 1960s onwards has inevitably led to the expansion in the number of cadet colleges and their distribution around the country.

the Pakistan Armed Forces that act as feeder schools for the services officer training academies of the Pakistan Army, Navy and Air Force. It was first introduced by Ayub Khan military ruler of Pakistan (1958–69).

Later on in the late 1990s many private Cadet Colleges were also made by Pakistani citizens to stand and collaborate with Pakistan armed forces in order to provide pre military academia training to the youth of Pakistan.
Most of the privately managed Cadet College are registered by Pakistan Armed Forces. Renowned Cadet College in private sector include Cadet College Fateh Jang, Kings Cadet College Gujrat,  Cadet College Kallar Kahar, Cadet College Jhelum and Cadet College Rawalpindi.

Eastern Pakistan and independence of Bangladesh 

In Eastern Pakistan the first cadet college was established in 1958, with three more cadet colleges were established between 1958 and 1964. No more cadet colleges were established after 1964 and after the independence of Bangladesh, the report of the first Education Commission headed by Qudrat-e-Khuda, recommended the dismantling of the cadet colleges.

After the Bangladesh Liberation War and subsequent formation of independence, Bangladesh has established several cadet colleges.

Purpose
They are specifically intended to prepare young students from a very broad range of socioeconomic and linguistic backgrounds to pass the demanding physical, educational, psychological and behavioural standards of the Inter Services Selection Board (ISSB). This is distinct from the purpose of regular cantonment schools intended to educate the children of service members.

The schools are overseen by the Joint Staff Headquarters (JSHQ) of the Joint Chiefs of Staff Committee.

Cadet colleges in Pakistan
 There are numerous Cadet Colleges in Pakistan both in government and private sector.

Cadet colleges in Bangladesh

See also
 Military College Jhelum 
 Cadet College Fateh Jang
 History of Military Colleges in British India
 Sainik School

References

 
Types of university or college